Manduca rustica, the rustic sphinx, is a moth of the family Sphingidae. The species was first described by Johan Christian Fabricius in 1775.

Distribution 
It is found in the southern parts of the United States (straying into the northern United States at times), southward through Mexico, Central America and South America to Uruguay.

Description

Biology 
The larvae feed on Jasminum and Bignonia species and other plants of the families Verbenaceae, Convolvulaceae and Lamiaceae and Boraginaceae.

The species is widespread and adaptable, living in varied habitats from rainforests to deserts and thriving in urban and disturbed habitat. It can live on many types of native and exotic plants.

Subspecies
Manduca rustica cortesi (Cary, 1963) (Mexico)
Manduca rustica cubana (Wood, 1915) (Cuba, Jamaica)
Manduca rustica calapagensis (Holland, 1889) (Galápagos Islands)
Manduca rustica harterti (Rothschild, 1894) (Lesser Antilles, including Bonaire and St. Lucia)
Manduca rustica rustica (Americas)

Gallery

References

External links

"Rustic sphinx". Featured Creatures. University of Florida.

Manduca
Moths described in 1775
Moths of North America
Sphingidae of South America
Moths of South America
Taxa named by Johan Christian Fabricius